Geislbach is a river of Bavaria, Germany in the district Erding. It is a left tributary of the Isen.

See also
List of rivers of Bavaria

References

Rivers of Bavaria
Rivers of Germany